Kisnapali was a Hittite general during the reign of Tudhaliya I in the early 14th century BC. He led a campaign in western Anatolia to secure Hittite control and fought there against Attarsiya of Ahhiya (widely accepted as the Achaeans of Mycenaean Greece).

Sources 

Hittite people
14th-century BC people